Yahor Dodaleu (born 1 February 1993) is a Belarusian swimmer. He competed in the men's 50 metre butterfly event at the 2017 World Aquatics Championships.

References

1993 births
Living people
Belarusian male swimmers
Place of birth missing (living people)
Male butterfly swimmers